Daniel Campbell (3 February 1944 – 16 August 2020) was an English footballer who played for Bradford Park Avenue, Stockport County and West Bromwich Albion. 

While at West Brom, Campbell was an understudy first to Stan Jones and later to John Talbut. He made his debut in the first leg of the 1966 Football League Cup Final against West Ham United, when Jones was injured. Albion lost that match by 2 goals to 1, but won the second leg (in which Campbell also played) 4-1, to win 5-3 on aggregate. He also played in four League games in March and April 1966, before Jones's return; three of them were away from home, and Albion failed to win any of them - drawing two and losing two.

Campbell died in South Africa on 16 August 2020 at the age of 76, due to a pulmonary embolism. Coincidentally, John Talbut had died on the previous day.

References

1944 births
2020 deaths
English footballers
Association football defenders
English Football League players
Droylsden F.C. players
West Bromwich Albion F.C. players
Los Angeles Wolves players
Stockport County F.C. players
Bradford (Park Avenue) A.F.C. players
English expatriate sportspeople in the United States
Expatriate soccer players in the United States
English expatriate footballers